Joëlle Wintrebert (born 1949 in Toulon) is a French writer. She primarily writes science fiction, but also writes children's literature and journalism. She has won the Prix Rosny-Aîné three times, first in 1980. She also edited the anthology series Univers.

Selected bibliography
 Les Olympiades truquées (1980) (1987) (1999) (2001)
 Les Maîtres-feu (1983) (1993)
 Nunatak (1983)
 Kidnapping en télétrans (1984) (1988) (1994) (1999)
 Chromoville (1984) (1994)
 La Fille de Terre Deux (1987) (1997)
 Bébé-miroir (1988)
 Le Créateur chimérique (1988)
 Comme un feu de sarments (1990) (1994) 
 L'Océanide (1992) (1998)
 Les Diables blancs (1993)
 Les Ouraniens de Brume (1996)
 La Colonie perdue (1998)
 Le Roi des limaces (1998)
 Les Gladiateurs de Thulé (1998)
 Le Vin de la colère (1998)
 Lentement s'empoisonnent (1999)
 Pollen (2002)
 Un Prince pour Ioan (2003)
 Le Canari fantôme (2005)
 Les Amazones de Bohême (2006)

External links
 Official site  

1949 births
Living people
French science fiction writers
Women science fiction and fantasy writers
French women novelists
French speculative fiction translators